The Jesuit Estates Act was an 1888 Act of the Legislative Assembly of Quebec that compensated the Society of Jesus for land confiscated in Canada by the British Crown after the suppression of the Society in 1774. When the revived Society returned to Canada in 1842, they began to campaign for the repossession of their allegedly confiscated estates. The premier of Quebec, Honoré Mercier, proposed the Jesuit Estates Act, which offered the Roman Catholic Church a financial settlement in return for incorporating the estates into Quebec's Crown lands. This measure provoked much controversy among Orangemen and Protestants, but it was not overturned.

History

Settlement in Quebec
Following the Suppression of the Jesuits by Pope Clement XIV in 1773, their lands in the Province of Quebec were seized by the British Crown in 1791, but possession was not taken until 1800, after all of their priests had either died or left Canada. The lands were subsequently transferred to the Province of Lower Canada in 1831, and the Legislative Assembly of Lower Canada passed legislation in 1832 providing for all income arising from the estates to be segregated from other Crown property and dedicated for educational purposes. After the Order was restored by Pope Pius VII in 1814 by virtue of the papal bull Sollicitudo omnium ecclesiarum, it was re-established in Canada in the 1840s, and in the following years it campaigned for compensation in order to establish a new Catholic university in Montreal. The province's archbishop, Elzéar-Alexandre Taschereau, instead proposed that the estates be sold off and the money divided among existing Catholic schools.

Through the mediation of Pope Leo XIII, a compromise was reached, and resulting Act in 1888 authorized a settlement which consisted of:

 a payment of $400,000 to be divided on the direction of the Pope (which went to the Jesuits, Laval University, and several Roman Catholic dioceses)
 the vesting of Laprairie Common in the Society, and
 a payment of $60,000 to the Protestant Committee of the Council of Public Instruction for appropriate investment by it.

Move for federal disallowance
In the House of Commons of Canada in February 1889, John Augustus Barron asked Minister of Justice John Thompson if the federal government would disallow the Quebec act. After Thompson replied that there was no intention, William Edward O'Brien proposed a resolution the following month requesting such action. In the subsequent debate, tensions were escalated when Dalton McCarthy declared:

The Conservative government of John A. Macdonald, together with the Liberal Party under Wilfrid Laurier, united to defeat the motion. The latter exclaimed, "Sir, this is not a party question; it is at most a family quarrel; it is simply a domestic disturbance in the ranks of the Conservative party."

In closing the debate, Macdonald declared:

By 188 to 13, the motion was defeated.

Impact and aftermath

The thirteen MPs that supported the resolution came to be known as either the "Noble Thirteen" or the "Devil's Dozen", and McCarthy resigned from the Conservative Party. Their subsequent efforts led to the creation of the Equal Rights Association and the McCarthyites, as well as the rise of French-language schooling conflicts in Manitoba and Ontario.

In order to reduce political tensions, in 1890 the Parliament of Canada passed an Act for the incorporation of the Orange Order in Canada. This recognized the political influence that the Orangeman had attained, which greatly affected the outcome of the 1891 federal election.

The campaign for the Act's disallowance was one of many religious disputes that arose in 19th-Century and early 20th-Century Canada, which included the dissolution of the clergy reserves in Upper Canada, the Guibord case in the 1870s, the Manitoba Schools Question in the 1890s, and Ontario's Regulation 17 in 1912.

Further reading

External links

References

1888 in Canadian law
Quebec provincial legislation
Legal history of Canada
Post-Confederation Canada (1867–1914)
Political history of Canada
History of Catholicism in Quebec
1888 in Quebec
1888 in Christianity
Housing legislation in Canada
Culture of Quebec
History of Christianity in Canada
Religion in Canada